Patrick Andrew McCaw (born October 25, 1995) is an American professional basketball player for the Delaware Blue Coats of the NBA G League. He played college basketball for the UNLV Runnin' Rebels and earned second-team all-conference honors in the Mountain West Conference (MWC) as a sophomore in 2016. McCaw was selected by the Milwaukee Bucks in the second round of the 2016 NBA draft. He won three NBA championships in his first three seasons: two with the Golden State Warriors and one with the Toronto Raptors, the first NBA player to do so while switching teams.

Early life
McCaw was born in St. Louis, Missouri, to Jeffery and Teresa McCaw. He initially attended Christian Brothers College High School but transferred to Montrose Christian School as a senior, where he averaged 13 points per game and led the team to a 20–5 record and the National Christian School Athletic Association Division I title. After he graduated, he was ranked as the 38th best shooting guard in the country.

College career
McCaw attended UNLV where, in two seasons, he averaged 12.2 points, 4.2 rebounds, 3.3 assists, 2.0 steals and 31.7 minutes in 65 games. In his sophomore season, he played 33 games and averaged 14.7 points, 5.2 rebounds, 3.9 assists and 2.45 steals in 33.7 minutes, having the second most steals in the nation. He earned second-team all-conference honors in the MWC and also was named to their all-defensive team.

On April 4, 2016, McCaw declared for the NBA draft.

Professional career

Golden State Warriors (2016–2018)

Rookie year and first ring (2016–2017) 

On June 23, 2016, McCaw was selected by the Milwaukee Bucks with the 38th overall pick in the 2016 NBA draft. He was later traded to the Golden State Warriors on draft night for cash considerations. Warriors executive board member, Jerry West, felt McCaw should not have slipped that far, saying "People are gonna be sorry they didn't draft him." On July 6, 2016, he signed with the Warriors and joined the team for the 2016 NBA Summer League.

McCaw made his debut for the Warriors in their season opener on October 25, 2016 against the San Antonio Spurs. In nine minutes off the bench, he recorded two points, two assists, one steal and one block in a 129–100 loss. On December 8, 2016, he scored a then-career-high 10 points, all in the first half of the Warriors' 106–99 win over the Utah Jazz. On December 29, he was assigned to the Santa Cruz Warriors, Golden State's D-League affiliate. The next day, he was recalled by Golden State. On January 10, 2017, he made his first career start in place of an ill Klay Thompson, contributing one three-pointer in a 107–95 win over the Miami Heat. He was reassigned to Santa Cruz on January 13, and was recalled the next day. On February 13, 2017, McCaw made another start in place of Thompson and went on to score a career-high 19 points in a 132–110 loss to the Denver Nuggets. With starting forward Kevin Durant injuring his knee on February 28, McCaw started in place of Durant in most games.

McCaw made his first career playoff start in Game 2 of the first round on April 19 in place of injured Durant in which the Warriors won 110–81 over the Portland Trail Blazers. He finished with nine points, five rebounds, one block, one steal, and an overall plus-27. McCaw started in place of Durant again in Game 3, contributing eight points, five rebounds, five assists, one block, and three steals in a 119–113 comeback win in Portland. In Game 2 of the Western Conference Finals against the San Antonio Spurs, McCaw had 18 points, five assists, three rebounds, and three steals off the bench to help the Warriors win 136–100. McCaw was 6-for-8 from the field, including 3-for-4 on three-pointers. McCaw became the first rookie in the NBA with at least 18 points off the bench in a playoff game since James Harden in 2010, and the first Warriors rookie to do so since Robert Parish in 1977. McCaw started again in Game 4, finishing with six points, four rebounds, two assists, one block, and a plus-12 in a 129–115 win over the Spurs. The Warriors went on to win the 2017 NBA Championship after defeating the Cleveland Cavaliers 4–1 in the NBA Finals. The Warriors finished the playoffs with a 16–1 record, the best postseason winning percentage in NBA history.

Second championship (2017–2018) 
On November 27, 2017, McCaw, starting in place of an injured Stephen Curry, scored a season-best 16 points with career highs of seven assists and four steals in a 110–106 loss to the Sacramento Kings. On March 31, 2018, McCaw left late in the third quarter of the Warriors' 112–96 win over the Kings after a scary landing following an undercut by Vince Carter. He drove the baseline and went down with a thud with 41.8 seconds left in the quarter, hit in the lower body by Carter. McCaw laid still and cried on the floor for roughly 10 minutes before being stretchered off and taken to UC Davis Medical Center for further evaluation. The following day, he was released from the hospital with a bruised lumbar spine. McCaw returned from injury in Game 6 of the Western Conference Finals against the Houston Rockets. The Warriors went on to defeat the Rockets in Game 7 to advance to the NBA Finals for the fourth straight season, where they won their second straight championship with a four-game sweep of the Cavaliers.

Following the 2017–18 season, McCaw became a restricted free agent. In October 2018, he allowed the Warriors' $1.71 million qualifying offer to expire without accepting it, and reportedly declined another two-year, $5.2 million offer from the team. He remained restricted, with the Warriors retaining the right to match any offer from another team.

Cleveland Cavaliers (2018–2019)
After remaining on the free agent market for nearly six months, McCaw signed with the Cleveland Cavaliers on December 30, 2018. The Warriors had declined to match the offer, which was reportedly a non-guaranteed, two-year, $6 million deal. On January 6, 2019, he was waived by the Cavaliers after appearing in three games.

Toronto Raptors (2019–2021)
On January 10, 2019, McCaw signed with the Toronto Raptors. The Raptors advanced to the 2019 NBA Finals against McCaw's former team, the Golden State Warriors, where they won the series in six games to give McCaw his third straight championship. He became the third player ever to win titles in three consecutive seasons with different teams, joining Steve Kerr and Frank Saul, and he became the first player to win three consecutive NBA titles since Shaquille O'Neal, Kobe Bryant, Robert Horry, Derek Fisher, Rick Fox, Brian Shaw & Devean George led the Los Angeles Lakers to three straight wins from 2000 to 2002. He also became the seventh player to win a championship during each of his first three years in the league. On July 8, 2019, the Toronto Raptors announced that they had re-signed with McCaw. On November 6, 2019, the Toronto Raptors announced that McCaw had undergone arthroscopic surgery on his left knee and was expected to be sidelined for about four weeks.

On April 9, 2021, the Raptors waived McCaw.

Delaware Blue Coats (2022–present) 
On February 11, 2022, McCaw was acquired by the Delaware Blue Coats of the NBA G League.

Career statistics

NBA

Regular season

|-
| style="text-align:left;background:#afe6ba;"| †
| style="text-align:left;"| Golden State
| 71 || 20 || 15.1 || .433 || .333 || .784 || 1.4 || 1.1 || .5 || .2 || 4.0
|-
| style="text-align:left;background:#afe6ba;"| †
| style="text-align:left;"| Golden State
| 57 || 10 || 16.9 || .409 || .238 || .765 || 1.4 || 1.4 || .8 || .2 || 4.0
|-
| style="text-align:left;| 
| style="text-align:left;"| Cleveland
| 3 || 0 || 17.7 || .222 || .250 || – || 1.0 || .7 || .7 || .0 || 1.7
|-
| style="text-align:left;background:#afe6ba;"| †
| style="text-align:left;"| Toronto
| 26 || 1 || 13.2 || .444 || .333 || .867 || 1.7 || 1.0 || .8 || .1 || 2.7
|-
| style="text-align:left;| 
| style="text-align:left;"| Toronto
| 37 || 12 || 27.5 || .414 || .324 || .722 || 2.3 || 2.1 || 1.1 || .1 || 4.6
|-
| style="text-align:left;| 
| style="text-align:left;"| Toronto
| 5 || 0 || 6.6 || 1.000 || – || 1.000 || .6 || .8 || .4 || .0 || 1.0
|- class="sortbottom"
| style="text-align:center;" colspan="2"| Career
| 199 || 43 || 16.9 || .420 || .305 || .785 || 1.6 || 1.4 || .7 || .2 || 3.8

Playoffs

|-
| style="text-align:left;background:#afe6ba;"| 2017†
| style="text-align:left;"| Golden State
| 15 || 3 || 12.1 || .438 || .348 || .846 || 2.2 || 1.1 || .6 || .2 || 4.1
|-
| style="text-align:left;background:#afe6ba;"| 2018†
| style="text-align:left;"| Golden State
| 6 || 0 || 2.7 || .500 || .000 || 1.000 || .5 || .0 || .3 || .0 || .7
|-
| style="text-align:left;background:#afe6ba;"| 2019†
| style="text-align:left;"| Toronto
| 11 || 0 || 4.4 || .200 || .333 || 1.000 || .3 || .4 || .2 || .0 || .5
|- class="sortbottom"
| style="text-align:center;" colspan="2"| Career
| 32 || 3 || 7.7 || .418 || .333 || .882 || 1.2 || .6 || .4 || .1 || 2.2

College

|-
| style="text-align:left;"| 2014–15
| style="text-align:left;"| UNLV
| 32 || 16 || 29.6 || .402 || .368 || .714 || 3.3 || 2.7 || 1.5 || .3 || 9.6
|-
| style="text-align:left;"| 2015–16
| style="text-align:left;"| UNLV
| 33 || 32 || 33.7 || .465 || .366 || .774 || 5.1 || 3.9 || 2.5 || .4 || 14.7
|- class="sortbottom"
| style="text-align:center;" colspan="2"| Career
| 65 || 48 || 31.7 || .439 || .367 || .753 || 4.2 || 3.3 || 2.0 || .4 || 12.2

Personal life
McCaw has five siblings. His older brother, Jeffrey McCaw, died during the 2019 Eastern Conference finals, resulting in McCaw missing the first five games of the series against the Milwaukee Bucks for personal reasons.

References

External links

 UNLV Runnin' Rebels bio

1995 births
Living people
American expatriate basketball people in Canada
American men's basketball players
Basketball players from St. Louis
Cleveland Cavaliers players
Golden State Warriors players
Milwaukee Bucks draft picks
Santa Cruz Warriors players
Shooting guards
Toronto Raptors players
UNLV Runnin' Rebels basketball players
United States men's national basketball team players